Asiad Main Stadium may refer to: 

 Major Dhyan Chand National Stadium
 Rizal Memorial Stadium
 National Stadium (Tokyo, 1958)
 Gelora Bung Karno Stadium
 Azadi Stadium
 National Stadium (Thailand)
 Jawaharlal Nehru Stadium (Delhi)
 Seoul Olympic Stadium
 Workers' Stadium
 Hiroshima Park Stadium
 Rajamangala Stadium
 Busan Asiad Main Stadium
 Khalifa International Stadium
 Guangdong Olympic Stadium
 Incheon Asiad Main Stadium
 Hangzhou Sports Park Stadium
 Paloma Mizuho Stadium